The Cerro Fortaleza Formation, in older literature described as Pari Aike Formation, is a Late Cretaceous geologic formation of Campanian to Maastrichtian age (although it has formerly been reported to be Cenomanian to Santonian) of the Austral Basin in southern Patagonia, Argentina.

Description 
The sandstones of the formation were deposited in a fluvial environment. These formations are considered Campanian & Maastrichtian in age, respectively, making the Cerro Fortaleza Formation aged between them. 

The giant titanosaurs Puertasaurus and Dreadnoughtus, the megaraptoran Orkoraptor, Austrocheirus isasii, and the ornithopod Talenkauen have been recovered from the formation alongside turtles and crocodiles.

See also 
 List of dinosaur-bearing rock formations

References

Bibliography 

 
 
 

Geologic formations of Argentina
Upper Cretaceous Series of South America
Cretaceous Argentina
Campanian Stage
Maastrichtian Stage of South America
Sandstone formations
Fluvial deposits
Formations
Fossiliferous stratigraphic units of South America
Paleontology in Argentina
Geology of Patagonia
Geology of Santa Cruz Province, Argentina